Mauro Trentini (born 12 September 1975 in Trento) is an Italian former track cyclist, specialising in the pursuit, where he was team pursuit world champion in 1996 and individual pursuit bronze medalist in 1999.

Palmarès

External links 
 
 

1975 births
Living people
Cyclists at the 1996 Summer Olympics
Italian male cyclists
Olympic cyclists of Italy
UCI Track Cycling World Champions (men)
Sportspeople from Trento
Italian track cyclists
Cyclists from Trentino-Alto Adige/Südtirol